Guillaume Benon (born May 16, 1975 in Croix) is a French professional football player. Currently, he plays in the Championnat de France amateur for USL Dunkerque.

He played on the professional level in Ligue 2 for ES Wasquehal and Dijon FCO.

1975 births
Living people
People from Croix, Nord
French footballers
Ligue 2 players
Dijon FCO players
FC Sète 34 players
Association football defenders
Sportspeople from Nord (French department)
Wasquehal Football players
Footballers from Hauts-de-France